Barium hypochlorite is a chemical compound with the formula Ba(ClO)2.

Applications
It is used as a bleaching agent of textiles, paper and pulp; in the decontamination of explosives; as an antiseptic; as an ingredient to make chloropicrin.

References

 Chemical Encyclopedia / Editorial Board.: Knunyants IL and others. - M .: Soviet Encyclopedia, 1988. - T. 1. - 623 p.
 Handbook of chemical / Editorial Board.: Nikolsky BP and others. - 3rd ed., Rev. - L. : Chemistry, 1971. - T. 2. - 1168 s

Barium compounds
Hypochlorites